"Get Over" is the 11th single by Japanese band Dream. First press copies of the single came with a Hikaru no Go sticker. The single reached number 12 on the weekly Oricon charts and charted for eight weeks. This track was used as the first opening theme to the TV Tokyo anime Hikaru no Go.

Track list
 Get Over (original mix)
 Get Over (Keith Litman's Klub mix)
 Get Over (2the future remix)
 Get Over (instrumental)

Staff
 Lyrics: Mai Matsumuro
 Music: Bounceback
 Arrangement: Masafumi Nakao

External links
 http://www.oricon.co.jp/music/release/d/461809/1/

2001 singles
Dream (Japanese group) songs
Songs written by Mai Matsumuro
2001 songs
Avex Trax singles